Patar is a village and jamoat in north-western Tajikistan. It is part of the city of Konibodom in Sughd Region. The jamoat has a total population of 17,870 (2015).

References

Jamoats of Tajikistan
Populated places in Sughd Region